The Krottenspitze (2,551m) is a mountain in the Allgäu Alps. It is one of the few rocky summits of the main ridge that is visible from Oberstdorf.

Location and area 
The Krottenspitze is joined to the Öfnerspitze by a flat saddle. From the summit the jagged arête of the Krottenspitzengrat runs away to the west-northwest. The most striking pinnacle along this ridge is called the Krummer Turm ("Crooked Tower").
The steep north arête forms the continuation of the main ridge to the Kreuzeck. To the northwest below the Krottenspitze and the Krottenspitzengrat lies the cirque of Märzle, through which runs the path from the Kemptner Hut to the Prinz Luitpold Haus. Due to its exposed north-facing location, this cirque is often filled with old snow until the height of summer.

First ascent 
The first ascent of the Krottenspitze probably took place during survey work in the year 1854. That same year Dr. Gümbel also conquered the mountain.

Ascent 
There are no marked routes to the Krottenspitze. The easiest approach branches off the path to the Muttlerkopf and is marked in places with cairns, but is hard to find. It requires sure-footedness and experience of navigation in trackless terrain.

Gallery

Sources 
Das schöne Allgäu. Die Zeitschrift für Brauchtum, Kultur, Heimatpflege, Freizeit und Umwelt, September 1970
Thaddäus Steiner: Allgäuer Bergnamen, Lindenberg, Kunstverlag Josef Fink, 2007, 
Thaddäus Steiner: Die Flurnamen der Gemeinde Oberstdorf im Allgäu, Munich, Selbstverlag des Verbandes für Flurnamenforschung in Bayern, 1972
Zettler/Groth: Alpenvereinsführer Allgäuer Alpen. Munich, Bergverlag Rudolf Rother 1984.

References

External links 

 The Krottenspitze 

Mountains of the Alps
Mountains of Bavaria
Mountains of Tyrol (state)
Two-thousanders of Austria
Oberallgäu
Allgäu Alps
Two-thousanders of Germany